Mount Hotham Alpine Resort is an Australian alpine resort, is located in the Alpine region of Victoria. Set on the slopes of Mount Hotham, the ski resort comprises an alpine village, situated at an altitude of  AHD, making it the second highest resort village in Australia after Charlotte Pass village, in New South Wales.

The alpine resort operations are located within an unincorporated area (statutory authority) of Victoria surrounded by the locality of Hotham Heights in the Alpine Shire. Road access to the resort is via the Great Alpine Road.

Mount Hotham is host to a number of historic sites, namely the Zirky's Mount Hotham Hotel, Snake Gully and Arlberg Chalet.

Ownership and operation
The land of the resort is operated by Alpine Resorts Victoria, the statutory authority, and the skifields and lift infrastructure are operated by Vail Resorts (leaseholder), who purchased the Mount Hotham Skiing Company from Merlin Entertainments. Vail Resorts' operating company is Mount Hotham Skiing Company (MHSC), that was granted a lease from the Government of Victoria via the Mt Hotham Resort Management Board. A subsidiary company of MHSC operates the Mount Hotham Airport.

Visiting in Winter 
During the declared snow season (usually from the Queen's Birthday long weekend in June till the first weekend in October), it is a legal requirement to carry diamond pattern wheel chains and fit them if directed. There are penalties for not doing so. The steep and exposed portions of the Great Alpine Road between Harrietville and Hotham Heights means that in some conditions, vehicles (particularly two wheel drive vehicles) are not able to travel safely without these wheel chains.

Visitors also need to purchase a Resort Entry permit to enter the resort during winter. The resort entry fee contributes to essential services for guests around the mountain, including ski patrol, the free village buses, snow clearing of car parks in the village, waste management and environmental initiatives.

Winter sports

Most of the skiing and snowboarding is based on one side of a large valley, and the area connects to the Bogong High Plains. Hotham features  of ski area including  of tree-lined cross-country trails and a network of fourteen lifts. The resort features an abundance of runs for skiers and boarders of all standards from beginners (20%) to intermediates (40%) and advanced (40%). The resort is home to one of Australia's most difficult runs, the steep Mary's Slide. It is also home to Australia's only biathlon range.

Lifts
 winter, the following ski lifts are in operation:

A list of all 30 lifts that have operated at Hotham over the years is at the Australian Ski Lift Directory.

Climate
As with most of the Australian Alps, Mount Hotham's climate is, compared to the bulk of Australia, cold throughout the year; with particularly cold maximum temperatures, and Mount Hotham is one of very few areas in Australia that frequently records maximum temperatures below freezing. Mount Hotham is also one of the only places in Australia to have never recorded a temperature above ; during the early 2009 southeastern Australia heat wave, whilst most of the state sweltered above , the mountain's peak temperature was a mild . 

Snowfall occurs frequently and heavily, and sub-freezing maximum temperatures can be recorded throughout the year—even in high summer; however, due to frequent winter cloud and the mountain's exposed position, a temperature below  has only once-occurred since records began in 1990. Mount Hotham receives an average of 66.1 snowy days annually. It is the coldest weather station on mainland Australia by maximum temperatures.

Owing to its short, cool summers and long, cold winters, Mount Hotham yields a Subpolar oceanic climate (Cfc) bordering on Tundra (ET).

See also

Mt Hotham Visitor Website
Mount Hotham Airport
Great Alpine Road
Skiing in Australia

References

External links

Mount Hotham Ski Resort website
A list of all 30 lifts that have operated at Hotham over the years is at the Australian Ski Lift Directory.
Mount Hotham Hotel Accommodation website
History of skiing at Mount Hotham, and development of the resort
Mount Hotham Accommodation Package Deal
Mount Hotham Modern Apartments
Information for Snow and Skiing Holidays at Mount Hotham

Ski areas and resorts in Victoria (Australia)
Victorian Alps